Olu Ginuwa II was a Nigerian traditional title holder and paramount leader of the Itsekiri who was Olu of Warri from 1936 to 1949. He was the 17th Olu of Warri Kingdom with the title Ogiame Ginuwa II. He was born Emiko Ikengbuwa. He succeeded his grandfather Olu Akengbuwa as Olu of Warri after an interregnum that lasted 88 years when Warri's political leadership was dominated by merchant princes.

References

Nigerian traditional rulers
People from Warri
Year of birth unknown
Year of death unknown